Azzana is a commune in the Corse-du-Sud department on the island of Corsica, France.

The inhabitants of the commune are known as Azzanais or Azzanaises.

Geography
Azzana is located some 13 km north-east of Casaglione and 10 km north-west of Bocognano. Access to the commune is by road D4 from Salice in the west which passes through the centre of the commune and the village before continuing east to Rezza. The D125 goes south-west from the village to Lopigna. Apart from the village there is the hamlet of Vignamajo towards the south. The commune is remote and rugged with snow-capped mountains in the north and south and very extensive forests.

The river Liamone passes through the centre of the commune south of the village as it flows west to join the sea at Liamone.
The Cruzzini, a tributary of the Liamone, also flows through the commune.

Neighbouring communes and villages

Administration

List of Successive Mayors

Population

Culture and heritage

Civil heritage
The commune has a very large number of buildings and structures that are registered as historical monuments.

Religious heritage
The commune has several religious buildings and structures that are registered as historical monuments:
The Funeral Chapel of the Marcangeli family (1935)
The old Chapel Sainte-Lucie (18th century). The chapel contains many items that are registered as historical objects:
A Sunburst Monstrance (20th century)
A Statue: Saint Lucie (19th century)
A set of 2 Choir Candlesticks (19th century)
A Crown Light fixture (2) (19th century)
A set of 2 Crown Light fixtures (1) (19th century)
A Sanctuary Lamp (19th century)
A Chasuble and Stole (20th century)
A set of 2 Bells (1929)
A set of 2 Altar Vases (19th century)
An Altar Vase (1) (19th century)
A set of 2 Cruets (19th century)
A Chalice with Paten (19th century)
A Baptismal font (18th century)
A Ciborium (2) (18th century)
A Ciborium (1) (1883)
The Furniture in the Church (1883)
The Church of Notre-Dame of Mount Carmel (18th century)
The Cemetery at Vallemajo (19th century). The Cemetery contains two items that are registered as historical objects:
A Tombstone of Julie Ottaviani (1900)
A Funerary Cross (1886)
The Tomb of Marie-Antoinette Vellutini (1923)
The Cemetery for the Antonietti and Vellutini families (19th century). The cemetery contains two items that are registered as historical objects:
A Funerary Cross of Marie-Dominique Antonietti (1895)
A Funerary Cross of Paul Marie Antonietti (1902)
The Funeral Chapel at Croce (19th century)
The former Parish Church of Saint-Nicolas de Bari (18th century). The church contains one item that is registered as an historical object:
A Baptismal font (18th century)

See also
Communes of the Corse-du-Sud department

References

External links

Azzana on Géoportail, National Geographic Institute (IGN) website 

Communes of Corse-du-Sud